Rhytida is a genus of medium-sized, air-breathing, predatory land snails, terrestrial pulmonate gastropod molluscs in the family Rhytididae.

This is the type genus of the family.

Distribution 
This genus is endemic to New Zealand.

Species
Species and subspecies recognised in the genus Rhytida are:
 Rhytida australis Hutton, 1883 Stewart Island/Rakiura
 Rhytida citrina Hutton, 1883 South Island
 Rhytida greenwoodi
 Rhytida greenwoodi greenwoodi (Gray, 1950) North Island
 Rhytida greenwoodi webbi Powell, 1949 South Island
 Rhytida meesoni
 Rhytida meesoni meesoni Suter, 1891 South Island
 Rhytida meesoni perampla Powell, 1946 South Island
 Rhytida oconnori Powell, 1946 South Island
 Rhytida otagoensis Powell, 1930 South Island
 Rhytida patula Hutton, 1883 South Island
 Rhytida stephenensis Powell, 1930 Stephens Island, Cook Strait

Note that the species/subspecies status of some of the above taxa is unclear and differs between sources.

References

Further reading 
 Efford M. G. 1998 Distribution and status of native carnivorous land snails in the genera Wainuia and Rhytida. Science for Conservation 101: 1–47.

 
Rhytididae
Taxa named by Eduard von Martens
Gastropod genera
Endemic fauna of New Zealand
Endemic molluscs of New Zealand
Gastropods of New Zealand